Sarah Hawley Schmelzel (born May 12, 1994) is an American professional golfer and LPGA Tour member.

Early life, college and amateur career
Schmelzel grew up in Phoenix, Arizona. Although she started playing golf when she was five, Schmelzel first competed in gymnastics. She was a talented at uneven bars and was an Arizona State Champion in the discipline. In 2001, she watched Annika Sörenstam card a 59 at her home course of Moon Valley, which sparked a passion for the game.

Schmelzel was highly ranked in both the National Junior Golf Scoreboard rankings and the Golfweek junior rankings. She was a standout at Xavier Prep and won the 2011 Arizona State High School Championship. Schmelzel led her school to its third team state title in four years, and carded rounds of 71-66 at the state championship to tie the Arizona state high school record with Amanda Blumenherst. She won the AJGA Bass Pro Shops/Payne Stewart Championship by 12 strokes with rounds of 69-71-70.

Schmelzel attended the University of South Carolina between 2012 and 2016 and played on the South Carolina Gamecocks women's golf team, where she captured one individual title. She was on the Southeastern Conference All-Freshman Team and was an honorable mention All-American as a senior.

Professional career
Schmelzel turned professional after graduating and joined the 2017 Symetra Tour. In her second season, she recorded seven top-10 finishes, including four top-five results in her last five events to finish 13th on the Epson Tour money list. She finished third at the inaugural LPGA Q-Series to earn her LPGA Tour card for the 2019 season.

In 2021, Schmelzel finished tied 17th at the Bank of Hope LPGA Match-Play, after her opponent Carlota Ciganda was assessed a slow-play penalty. Ciganda and Schmelzel came to the 18th hole tied, but as the slow-play penalty in match play is loss of hole, Schmelzel was awarded the hole, and won the match 1-up.

In 2022, Schmelzel made six birdies in her final seven holes to jump up the leaderboard into solo third at the LPGA Drive On Championship, her career-best finish on the LPGA Tour so far.

Amateur wins
2005 Kingman City Junior Championship
2006 Mesa City Junior Championship, Yuma City Junior Championship, Tucson Conquistadores Spring Classic
2007 Yuma City Junior Championship, JGAA Winter Classic
2008 Antigua/Milt Coggins Arizona Junior Championship, Yuma City Junior Championship, Tucson Conquistadores Spring Classic, JGAA Fall Classic
2009 Yuma City Junior Championship, Thunderbird Invitational
2011 Arizona State High School Championship, Pro Shops/Payne Stewart Championship
2016 Bryan National Collegiate

Source:

Results in LPGA majors

CUT = missed the half-way cut
NT = no tournament
T = tied

References

External links

American female golfers
LPGA Tour golfers
South Carolina Gamecocks women's golfers
Golfers from Phoenix, Arizona
1994 births
Living people